It-Turretta is a Maltese word meaning "the turret". Specifically, it may refer to the following towers in Malta:
Tower of St. Joseph, a 17th-century water tower in Santa Venera
Għaxaq Semaphore Tower, a 19th-century semaphore tower in Għaxaq

See also
Torretta, a Sicilian town called Turretta in Sicilian